Hetal Dave is India's first and only professional female sumo wrestler. In 2008, the woman from Mumbai made it into the Limca Book of Records.

She participated in the 2009 World Games held in Taiwan, but went out in the first round.

Personal life 
Her father and brother were very supportive of her interests in pursuing the sport. She is a commerce graduate and also trains students in wrestling and judo in different schools.

Dave is a Judo trainer and she started her Judo lessons when she was around 6.

Training 
Dave has no opponents to train with in India so has to practice with male players and also her brother Akshay. India doesn't have a Sumo Ring, so she had to practice in natural terrain, and she chose Oval Maidan in South Mumbai.

Her first international championship in Estonia, in 2008. She came among the global top 8 and was included in a list of 150 fearless women by Newsweek.

After Estonia, Dave has represented India in tournaments at Poland, Finland and Taiwan. At the 2009 World Games, she stood fifth in the women's middleweight category.

Recognition 
Sumo wrestling is not among the recognized sports in India, even then Dave has represented India in several competitions.

Hetal has recorded her name in the world's 150 fearless women.

When she participated in the World Games she was the only female participant from India to represent the country and Sumo out of more than 200 games.

References

External links 
 फेसबुक पन्ना
 बीबीसी हिंदी पर

Martial artists from Mumbai
Female sumo wrestlers
Indian female martial artists
Sportswomen from Maharashtra
Place of birth missing (living people)
1987 births
Living people